S.A. Ganapathy (1912 or 1917 – 4 May 1949) was a veteran of the communist underground resistance during Japanese occupation and postwar trade unionist in then Malaya (Peninsular Malaysia).

Personal life 
There is no evidence supporting the claim that Ganapathy was born in 1912 in Thambikkottai Keelakkadu Sundaram Village in Thanjavur District, Tamil Nadu, South India. However, High Commissioner of Malaya, Sir Henry Gurney stated in a telegram to Colonial Office dated 2 May 1949, that Ganapathy was born in 1917. 

Ganapathy's father was Arumugam Thevar and his mother's name was Vairathaal. After losing both his parents to cholera, he and his brother Sarguna, lived with their sister Vairamal. Later, at the age of 10, they migrated to Singapore with his uncle and grandfather, Subramaniam Thevar.

Involvement in politics 
Ganapathy was involved in political activities and volunteered with the Indian National Army. He returned to India around 1946 to participate in the Inter-Asian Conference which was held from 26 March to 2 April 1947 at Old Fort, Delhi. The conference was hosted by Nehru who headed the provisional government of India. Mahatma Gandhi spoke at the closing event on 2 April 1947.

S.A. Ganapathy, the first president of the 300,000-strong Pan Malayan Federation of Trade Unions (PMFTU), was hanged by British authorities in Malaya on 4 May 1949 after being convicted for allegedly being in possession of firearms. Ganapathy was said to be on the way to the police to surrender his firearms, when he was arrested and sentenced to hang in Pudu Prison, Kuala Lumpur.

His close allies and mentor Guru Devan, Anthonysamy, Arumugam Thevar from Thambikkottai, Kittu Thevar of Thambikottai Marvakkadu and many others were deported to India.

Following Ganapathy's execution, a huge protest was staged in Tamil Nadu. Former Tamil Nadu Chief Minister M. Karunanithi wrote a poem titled "Kayertril Thongiya Ganapathi" in protesting the execution of Ganapathy.

S.A. Ganapathy was believed to have written to his cousin's husband, Ramu Thevar, about his death sentence and request his body to be cremated. Unfortunately due to the letter, Ramu was arrested on suspicion and was kept in detention in Pulau Jerejak for two months. After Ganapathy's death, Sargunan was deported to Tamil Nadu. His family members also moved to India.

A small monument was built by local communist party at Thambikkotai Vadakadu High Street for Ganapathy.To commemorate SA ganapathy, A social activist kept a Street name as Malaya ganapathi nagar in his native village keelakadu. brother, Sargunan, died in 2009 at Parakkalakottai Village, Pattukkottai Taluk, Tamil Nadu, S. India.

References

External links 
 
 Malaya S. A. Ganapathy

1949 deaths
Malaysian communists
People from Tamil Nadu
People executed by British Malaya by hanging
Malaysian trade unionists
Executed communists